Sōsuke Sumitani (炭谷 宗佑 Sumitani Sōsuke, January 14, 1980 in Tokyo) is a Japanese announcer for Nippon Television. He was known for his good looks and was the sports announcer on various shows, slowly becoming a household name. Sumitani graduated from the Department of Economics at Keio University.

External links
Profile by Nippon TV 

1980 births
Living people
People from Tokyo
Japanese announcers
Radio and television announcers
Keio University alumni